Stefan Warkalla (born 22 August 1964) is a German sailor. He competed in the Laser event at the 1996 Summer Olympics.

References

External links
 

1964 births
Living people
German male sailors (sport)
Olympic sailors of Germany
Sailors at the 1996 Summer Olympics – Laser
Sportspeople from Dortmund